Educational Films Corp. v. Ward, 282 U.S. 379 (1931), was a United States Supreme Court case in which the Court held a state's  corporate income tax may include royalties from copyrights in its calculation of overall income for the purposes of a franchise tax,  even though direct income from copyrights, a federal institution, is immune from state taxation.

References

External links
 

United States copyright case law
United States Supreme Court cases
United States Supreme Court cases of the Hughes Court
1931 in United States case law
Corporate taxation in the United States
United States corporate case law
United States taxation and revenue case law